WDR may refer to:

 Waddell & Reed (stock ticker: WDR), an American asset management and financial planning company
 Walt Disney Records, an American record label of the Disney Music Group
 WDR neuron, a type of neuron involved in pain signalling
  (German: 'West German Broadcasting'), a German public-broadcasting institution 
 Wet dress rehearsal, system tests of a fully integrated space launch vehicle
 Wide dynamic range, a synonym of high dynamic range and HDR
 Willo Davis Roberts (1928–2004), American writer
 World Development Report, an annual report published since 1978 by the World Bank